Tank (stylised as TANK) is an automotive marque owned by the Chinese carmarker Great Wall Motors that specialises in SUVs.

History

After the Tank 300 model went on sale under the Wey brand in December 2020, Great Wall Motors announced in March 2021 that it would market off-road vehicles under the independent Tank brand in the future. The 300 was the first model of the brand. As part of Auto Shanghai in 2021, two more off-road vehicles were presented with the Tank 700 and Tank 800. The Tank 400, Tank 500, and Tank 600 were further previewed in August 2021.

Models

Current 

 Tank 300
 Tank 500

Upcoming 

 Tank 400
Tank 600
Tank 700
Tank 800

Concept 

 Tank 100

References

External links 

 Official Website (in Chinese) 

Vehicle manufacturing companies established in 2021
Great Wall Motors
Chinese brands